Dean White (born 4 December 1958) is an English former professional footballer.

Playing career
His clubs included Chelsea, Millwall, and Gillingham, for whom he made over 160 Football League appearances.

Managerial career
After ending his professional playing career early due to injury, White moved on to coaching and managing, having two spells in charge of Hastings Town before moving to Brighton and Hove Albion under manager Micky Adams working initially as first team coach and reserve team manager and then assistant first team manager and head of recruitment. He left Brighton in November 2009 and went on to work in player recruitment at Sunderland and then onto Hull City in 2013 before being appointed as first team senior European scout at Tottenham Hotspur in 2017.

Personal life
His son, Ben White, was also a footballer and was on the books of Gillingham between 1998 and 2003. He is currently the professional development lead coach at the club.

References

1958 births
Living people
English footballers
Gillingham F.C. players
Millwall F.C. players
Hastings United F.C. players
Sportspeople from Hastings
Brighton & Hove Albion F.C. managers
Hastings United F.C. managers
Association football midfielders
English football managers
Tottenham Hotspur F.C. non-playing staff